Greenmount, Queensland may refer to:

 Greenmount Beach, a beach on the Gold Coast of Queensland
Greenmount, a neighbourhood in the City of Gold Coast within the suburb of Coolangatta
 Greenmount, Queensland (Mackay Region), a rural locality in Central Queensland
 Greenmount, Queensland (Toowoomba Region), a rural town on the Darling Downs, Queensland